A rockery or rock garden is an element of grounds design.

Rockery may also refer to:

 The Rockery, Easton, Massachusetts, USA; a Memorial Cairn created by Frederick Law Olmsted
 The Grand Rockery, a rock garden located in Shanghai, China's Yu Garden
 The Rockery, a hall located in Hong Kong's Nan Lian Garden
 The Rockeries, a rock garden with multiton piled rocks in Derbyshire, England, UK, at the Chatsworth House
 The Rockery, a rock garden located in Preston Park, Brighton
 Rockery Cottage, a Scottish listed building; see List of listed buildings in Dirleton, East Lothian

See also

 
 
 
 
 Rookery (disambiguation)
 Rock garden (disambiguation)
 Rocker (disambiguation)
 Rockies (disambiguation)
 Rocky (disambiguation)
 Rock (disambiguation)